Bishunpura is one of the administrative blocks of Garhwa district, Jharkhand state, India.

About Bishunpura  Garhwa Jharkhand 
Bishunpura  a Taluka (Block), close to Garhwa, is located 35 km from Garhwa. Bishunpura is located in north west of Garhwa. It is one of the border location of Jharkhand. It's well covered by Vodafone, Airtel, Uninor, Reliance, BSNL, Aircel, Idea, Airtel 3G, like cellular networks.

Languages
Languages spoken here include Asuri, an Austroasiatic language spoken by approximately 17,000 people in India, largely in the southern part of Palamu; and Bhojpuri, a language in the Bihari language group that has almost 40,000,000 speakers and is written in both the Devanagari and Kaithi scripts.

Facilities
Market:   A small market called as  Bishunpura  bazar is situated in middle of the block.

Railway
Ramna, a railway station of ECR is not more than 10 km away from Bishunpura bazar.

See also
Garhwa district
Palamu district
Jharkhand

References

Garhwa district
Community development blocks in Jharkhand
Community development blocks in Garhwa district
Cities and towns in Garhwa district